Duncan Taylor may refer to:

 Duncan Taylor (company), a Scottish alcoholic beverages company
 Duncan Taylor (diplomat) (born 1958), British diplomat
 Duncan Taylor (rugby union) (born 1989), Scottish rugby union player

Taylor, Duncan